The 2018 Southern Steel season saw the Southern Steel netball team compete in the 2018 ANZ Premiership and the 2018 Netball New Zealand Super Club. With a team coached by Reinga Bloxham, captained by Wendy Frew and featuring Gina Crampton, Shannon Francois, Te Paea Selby-Rickit and Te Huinga Reo Selby-Rickit, Steel retained the ANZ Premiership title, winning their second consecutive premiership after defeating Central Pulse 54–53 in the grand final. In the Super Club tournament, Steel finished third.

Players

Player movements

Notes
 Malysha Kelly was injured during pre-season.

2018 roster

  	

 

 

 

 

Notes
 Georgia Heffernan, Taneisha Fifita, Jess Allan and Kendall McMinn were included in the extended squad for the Super Club.

Debuts
 Kendall McMinn made her senior debut for Steel in Round 3 against Northern Mystics.
 Kate Heffernan and Taneisha Fifita made their senior debut for Steel in Round 6 against Mainland Tactix.

Pre-season
Sunshine Coast Lightning series
In March 2018, Steel played a two match series against the 2017 Suncorp Super Netball premiers, Sunshine Coast Lightning.

Pre-Season Tournament
Steel also participayed in the official pre-season tournament at Te Wānanga o Raukawa in Otaki from 20 to 22 April.

ANZ Premiership regular season

Fixtures and results
Round 1
Steel's unbeaten run in competitive matches continued into the 2018 season. However, after defeating Northern Mystics in their opening match, they were beaten 62–51 by Central Pulse, ending a 22–match win streak. The streak included 17 ANZ Premiership matches and five Super Club matches.

Round 2

Round 3

Round 4

Round 5

Round 6

Round 7

Round 8

Round 9

Round 10

Round 11

Round 12

Round 13

Final standings

ANZ Premiership Finals Series

Elimination final

Grand final

Netball New Zealand Super Club

Group stage

Final ladder

1st/4th Play offs

Third place play-off

Award winners

Team of the season
Two Southern Steel players were named in Brendon Egan's Stuff Seven team of the season.

References

2018
2018 ANZ Premiership season
2018 in New Zealand netball